Rose King is a New Zealand army officer and the first woman career soldier in New Zealand to be promoted to the rank of brigadier. She was in the Royal New Zealand Electrical and Mechanical Engineers Corps, and in 2021 was appointed joint head of managed isolation and quarantine (MIQ) in New Zealand.

Biography 
King was born in Whanganui.

King has been in the New Zealand Army since 1991. She started at the base in Waiouru, attending the Officer Cadet School. She graduated into the Royal New Zealand Electrical and Mechanical Engineers Corps. Her deployments include Croatia and Afghanistan.

In May 2021, King was promoted to the rank of brigadier from general-list officer at a ceremony led by Chief of Defence Force, Air Marshal Kevin Short. She is the first general-list woman officer to be afforded this rank. There are two special officer women brigadiers. Chief of Army Major-General John Boswell said of the promotion, "This promotion is a significant occasion; not just for Rose, but for the NZ Army also."

In June 2021, King was seconded as joint head of MIQ, alongside Megan Main. King succeeded Brigadier Jim Bliss after his six-month secondment. MIQ is run by the Ministry of Business, Innovation and Employment as part of New Zealand's all-of-government COVID-19 national response border measures, and was implemented in April 2020.

Her husband, Lieutenant-Colonel Glenn King, is also in the defence force, and they have two children.

Awards 
 NATO Meritorious Service Medal
 United States Meritorious Service Medal
 United States Army Commendation (for services in Afghanistan)

References 

Year of birth missing (living people)
New Zealand brigadiers
Living people
People from Whanganui
New Zealand Army officers
New Zealand women